Dancing Daze is a 1986 Australian mini series about two sisters from Wagga Wagga who leave their family pig farm to make it as dancers in the big city.

At the ARIA Music Awards of 1987, Matthews was nominated for ARIA Award for Best Female Artist for the title track. Martin Armiger was nominated for ARIA Award for Best Original Soundtrack, Cast or Show Album for the album.

Soundtrack

Dancing Daze soundtrack was released in February 1986.

SIDE A:
 "Dancing Daze" (Sharon O'Neill) performed by Wendy Matthews and Jenny Morris.
 "Can I Dance" (Mick Walter, Glen Muirhead - G. Lungren) performed by Mark Williams.
 "Second Opinion" (Jenny Morris, Richard Fataar) performed by Mark Williams. 
 "Dare to Be Bold" (Sharon O'Neill) performed by Wendy Matthews.
 "You're So Curious" (Jennifer Hunter-Brown, Michael Hegarty) performed by Marc Hunter.
 "Disaster" (Stephen Cummings, Dean Richards) performed by Jane Clifton.
SIDE V:
 "Against the Dance" (Martin Armiger) performed by Mark Williams. 
 "I Love It When We're Dancing" (Greg Macainsh, David Briggs) performed by Martin Armiger and Sherlie Matthews
 "Might Have Been" (Martin Armiger, Michael Cove) performed by Jenny Morris, Mark Williams, Wendy Matthews. 
 "Phoebe" (Martin Armiger) performed by Marc Hunter. 
 "Casanova Club" (Larry Van Kriedt) performed by Larry Van Kriedt.
 "Lost in a Dancing Daze" (Martin Armiger) performed by Wendy Matthews.

References

External links

Australian television films
1986 soundtrack albums
Films directed by Peter Fisk
Films directed by Jane Campion